Ana González Rosa (born 26 March 1995) is a Spanish footballer who plays as a defender for Real Betis.

Club career
González started her career at Sevilla B.

References

External links
Profile at La Liga

1995 births
Living people
Women's association football defenders
Spanish women's footballers
Footballers from Seville
Sevilla FC (women) players
Real Betis Féminas players
Primera División (women) players
21st-century Spanish women